Velikoarkhangelskoye is a rural locality (a selo) and the administrative center of Velikoarkhangelskoye Rural Settlement, Buturlinovsky District, Voronezh Oblast, Russia. In ХІХ century the village an administrative center of Velikoarkhangelskaya volost, Bobrovsky Uyezd, Voronezh Governorate. The population was 1,134 as of 2010. There are 11 streets.

Geography 
Velikoarkhangelskoye is located 16 km east of Buturlinovka (the district's administrative centre) by road. Tyunikovo is the nearest rural locality.

References 

Rural localities in Buturlinovsky District